Giddings is a locational surname derived from a group of villages in Cambridgeshire, England, called Great Gidding, Little Gidding and Steeple Gidding.

List of people with the surname Giddings
David Giddings (1806–1900), American territorial legislator, engineer, and businessman
Dewitt Clinton Giddings (1827–1903), American politician
Franklin Henry Giddings (1855–1931), an American sociologist and economist
Harry Giddings, Jr. (1884–1949), a Canadian trainer and breeder of horses
Joshua Reed Giddings (1795–1864), an American statesman and a prominent opponent of slavery
Lara Giddings (born 1972), an Australian politician, Premier of Tasmania
Marsh Giddings (1816–1875), a US politician
Napoleon Bonaparte Giddings (1816–1897), United States Senator
J. Calvin Giddings (1930-1996), US American chemistry professor
J. Wight Giddings (1858–1933), American politician
Paula Giddings (born 1947), a writer and African-American historian
Ruth Giddings (1911–2015), Irish contract bridge player
Stuart Giddings (born 1986), an English footballer
Jace Giddings (Born 1987), American activist known for his crusade against the Pringles corporation

References

English toponymic surnames